Epepeotes andamanicus is a species of beetle in the family Cerambycidae. It was described by Charles Joseph Gahan in 1893.

References

andamanicus
Beetles described in 1893